The winners of the 2003 Internet Movie/Television Awards, given by the Internet Entertainment Writers Association, are listed below.

Movie Awards
Internet Movie Awards 2003
2003
The winners of the Internet Movie Awards:

Favorite Actor in a Leading Role: Johnny Depp - Pirates of the Caribbean: The Curse of the Black Pearl
Favorite Actor in a Supporting Role: Sean Astin - The Lord of the Rings: The Return of the King
Favorite Actress in a Leading Role: Ellen DeGeneres - Finding Nemo
Favorite Actress in a Supporting Role: Miranda Otto - The Lord of the Rings: The Return of the King
Favorite Director: Peter Jackson - The Lord of the Rings: The Return of the King
Favorite Picture: The Lord of the Rings: The Return of the King
Favorite Song from a Movie: "Into the West" - The Lord of the Rings: The Return of the King
Favorite Soundtrack or Musical Score: The Lord of the Rings: The Return of the King
Favorite Screenplay: The Lord of the Rings: The Return of the King - Frances Walsh, Philippa Boyens, and Peter Jackson
Favorite Visual Effects: The Lord of the Rings: The Return of the King
Breakthrough Performance: Keira Knightley - Bend It Like Beckham
Worst Picture: Gigli

 

2003 film awards
2003 television awards